Faruk Özlü (born 19 November 1962) is a Turkish politician from the Justice and Development Party (AKP) who served as the Minister of Science, Industry and Technology of Turkey from 24 May 2016 to 10 July 2018. He was a Member of Parliament for the electoral district of Düzce, having been first elected in the June 2015 general election and re-elected in the November 2015 general election.

Early life and career

Education
Faruk Özlü was born on 19 November 1962 in Düzce and studied at Düzce High School before graduating from the Yıldız Technical University (YTÜ) as a mechanical engineer. He obtained a master's degree and a doctorate from Istanbul Technical University (İTÜ). He obtained further education regarding projects and engineering in Spain, before taking a senior management course at Harvard University in the United States.

Early career and civil service
In 1987, Özlü returned to YTÜ as a researcher. In 1990, he joined the Defence Industry Undersecretariat as an engineer. He later became an expert, project manager, department manager and assistant undersecretary. He also briefly served as the acting undersecretary. While working at the Undersecretariat, Özlü oversaw projects such as Turkey's first domestically produced tank ALTAY, the country's first unmanned spacecraft ANKA, its first domestically produced warship MİLGEM. He also worked on the development of the Airbus A400M Atlas military transport aircraft, the F-35 and F-16 fighter jets, helicopter electronic warfare systems, the M60 tank modernisation, long range air and missile defense systems, coding and simulation.

He has served on the executive boards of Turkish Aerospace Industries (TAI-TUŞAŞ), Airport Operations and Aviation Industries (HEAŞ), Teknopark İstanbul and Defence Technologies Engineering and Commerce (STM).

Minister of science, industry and technology
Özlü joined the Justice and Development Party (AKP) and was elected as a Member of Parliament for the electoral district of Düzce in the June 2015 general election. He was re-elected in the November 2015 general election. Following the resignation of Ahmet Davutoğlu as Prime Minister in May 2016, the AKP held an Extraordinary Congress on 22 May to determine his successor. Binali Yıldırım was elected as party leader unopposed and formed his cabinet on 24 May, appointing Özlü as the Minister of Science, Industry and Technology.

See also
Aviation in Turkey
Turkish Air Force

References

External links
MP profile on the Grand National Assembly website
Collection of all relevant news items at Haberler.com
Faruk Özlü profile on Graph Commons

Living people
1962 births
People from Düzce
Yıldız Technical University alumni
Istanbul Technical University alumni
Justice and Development Party (Turkey) politicians
Members of the 25th Parliament of Turkey
Members of the 26th Parliament of Turkey
Members of the 65th government of Turkey
Deputies of Düzce